Naval Air Station Barbers Point , on O'ahu, also called John Rodgers Field (the original name of Honolulu International Airport), is a former United States Navy airfield closed in 1999, and renamed Kalaeloa Airport. Parts of the former air station serve as a film and television studio for the Hawaii State Film Office.

History

Attack on Pearl Harbor
On December 7, 1941, Barbers Point was one of the many targets attacked by the Japanese during the attack on Pearl Harbor. During the second wave, American pilots George Welch and Kenneth Taylor engaged Japanese aircraft, shooting down two aircraft.

The Navy acquired the airfield in early 1943.  At that time it consisted of two short runways and four hangars that were just two feet above hightide. A PNAB civilian contractor started work by bringing a dredge onto Keehi lagoon in February 1943.  In April the military took over.  The Army took over the dredging operation while Seabees of the 5th Naval Construction Battalion took over the airfield.  When they were done there would be three runways.  The Navy would turn the airfield into a major facility by sending Seabees from the 13th, 64th and 133rd Construction Battalions to do it.

Closing

NAS Barbers Point was closed by Base Realignment and Closure (BRAC) action in 1999, with the Navy aircraft, primarily P-3C Orion maritime patrol aircraft assigned to squadrons of Patrol Wing Two, relocating to Marine Corps Air Station Kaneohe Bay, now Marine Corps Base Hawaii, on the other side of the island.  However, Coast Guard Air Station Barbers Point, with its complement of HH-65 Dolphin helicopters and HC-130H Hercules aircraft, remained after the Navy's departure. Also, in 1972 the United States Army posted a CH-47 Chinook company, the 147th ASHC "Hillclimbers", supporting the Army's 25th Inf Div and USARPAC, and it was moved to the historic Wheeler Army Airfield, Schofield Barracks, for Hawaii Army National Guard use. Coast Guard Air Station Barbers Point is the only Coast Guard Air Station within the 14th United States Coast Guard District.

With the closure of NAS Barbers Point, the present day Kalaeloa Airport / John Rodgers Field is also home to Naval Air Museum Barbers Point, which preserves the history of the base and also has a collection of aircraft that reflect the US Navy's, US Marine Corps', US Coast Guard's and US Army's aviation presence on Barbers Point and in the state of Hawaii.

Production studio
By early 2017, the massive building which once served as the air station's aircraft intermediate maintenance facility had been leased by Navy Region Hawaii to the Hawaiian Department of Business, Economic Development and Tourism and the Hawaii State Film Office for use as a film and television studio. The Hawaii State Film Office had been interested in developing space on the former airfield into a filming studio to complement the department's first studio, the Hawaii Film Studio at Diamond Head in East Oahu. Donne Dawson, commissioner of the Hawaii State Film Office, stated that the new facility would "have all the components of a film office, such as office space for all departments, space for their props and wardrobes and a mill for set construction," and noted that, had Navy Region Hawaii not agreed to the lease, "there were not a lot of options" available to interested production companies beyond retrofitting warehouse space. ABC Studios and Marvel Television's Inhumans was the first production to use the newly created production facility.

Environmental contamination
Barbers Point consists of at least 35 sites where soil and or groundwater were contaminated per the DOD. As of 2017, 34 had been cleaned up, according to the DOD. This does not mean that these sites are no longer hazardous, as many of these sites were put under long-term monitoring or other restrictions.

See also

 Hawaii World War II Army Airfields
 HABS/HAER documentation of Naval Air Station Barbers Point for a listing of the very extensive documentation of Naval Air Station Barbers Point by the Historic American Buildings Survey

References

Further reading

External links
Naval Facilities Engineering Systems Command - Administrative records 

Barbers
Airports in Hawaii
Installations of the United States Navy in Hawaii
Buildings and structures in Honolulu County, Hawaii
Historic American Buildings Survey in Hawaii
Military installations closed in 1999